Subrantas Siswanto (11 April 1923 – 14 May 1980) was an Indonesian military officer who served as the governor of Riau between 1978 and 1980, and previously as the regent of Kampar Regency between 1967 and 1978.

Biography
Siswanto was born in Purworejo, today in Central Java, on 11 April 1923. He was transported to Sumatra during the Japanese occupation of the Dutch East Indies along with romusha corvee laborers, but once he was in Pekanbaru, he instead joined the Japanese Navy. During the Indonesian National Revolution, he fought the Dutch in Sumatra, and spent some time in Bengkalis. After the revolution, he was appointed chief of staff of several military units stationed in Riau. Starting from 18 May 1967, he was appointed as the regent of Kampar, serving until 1978.

After his time in Kampar, Siswanto was appointed as Riau's governor, and he was sworn in on 14 June 1978. In the middle of his term, on 14 May 1980, he passed away due to liver cancer in Pekanbaru. At the time of his death, he held the rank of brigadier general.

References

1923 births
1980 deaths
Regents of places in Riau
Governors of Riau
Indonesian generals
People from Purworejo Regency